Steve E. Ehlmann (born December 6, 1950) is an American Republican politician who has served as St. Charles County executive since 2007.  He has also served as a circuit judge and in the Missouri General Assembly in the Missouri Senate and the Missouri House of Representatives where he rose to the post of Senate minority floor leader.

Ehlmann graduated from Furman University with a bachelor's degree, from the University of Missouri with a master's degree in history, and from Washington University School of Law with a J.D. degree.  He has worked as a public school teacher and a practicing attorney.

County Executive Election History

References

1950 births
20th-century American politicians
People from St. Charles County, Missouri
County executives in Missouri
Republican Party members of the Missouri House of Representatives
Republican Party Missouri state senators
Living people
Washington University School of Law alumni
University of Missouri alumni
Furman University alumni